Chua Chu Kang Secondary School (CCKSS) is a co-educational government secondary school in Choa Chu Kang, Singapore.  Founded in 1992, the integrated government school offers secondary education under three academic streams, which leads to the Singapore-Cambridge GCE Ordinary Level or the Singapore-Cambridge GCE Normal Level examinations. The school would be merged with Teck Whye Secondary School (TWSS) in 2023, with the new school taking on the current name, Chua Chu Kang Secondary School.

History

Founding and pre-merger (1992–2022) 
Chua Chu Kang Secondary School (CCKSS) was founded in 1992 with a staff strength of only 10 teachers. A cohort of 318 Express stream and Normal (Academic) stream students joined the school in 1993 as the pioneer batch of students.

The school consistently pushed for higher standards, and was one of the top 20 Value-Added schools under the official ranking by the Ministry of Education in 2003. The school developed a niche in the area of Youth and Community Leadership as the school's Learning for Life Programme.

In 2012, the school celebrated its 20th anniversary and a series of videos was produced to commemorate the event.

Merger with Teck Whye Secondary School (2023–present) 
In face of the declining birth rates and changing demographics of Singapore, in April 2021, it was announced that Chua Chu Kang Secondary School would be merged with the nearby Teck Whye Secondary School (TWSS), along with 14 other secondary and primary schools to form 9 new schools. The new school would also  occupy TWSS's campus. The name of the new school was later revealed, in April 2022, to be Chua Chu Kang Secondary School in English, and taking on TWSS's Chinese name (德惠中学). The decision to retain the names in this manner was done after the Ministry of Education considered various factors including the schools' heritage and histories.

Academic information 
As the newly merged school, CCKSS offers three academic streams, namely the four-year Express course, as well as the Normal Course, comprising Normal (Academic) and Normal (Technical) academic tracks.

O Level Express course 
The Express course is a nationwide four-year programme that leads to the Singapore-Cambridge GCE Ordinary Level examinations.

Normal course 
The Normal course is a nationwide four-year programme leading to the Singapore-Cambridge GCE Normal Level examinations which runs either the Normal (Academic) [N(A)] or Normal (Technical) [N(T)] curriculum.

Normal (Academic) course 
In the Normal (Academic) course, students offer 5-8 subjects in the Singapore-Cambridge GCE Normal Level examinations. Compulsory subjects include:
 English Language
 Mother Tongue Language
 Mathematics
 Combined Humanities
 Combined Sciences

A fifth year leading to the Singapore-Cambridge GCE Ordinary Level examinations is available to N(A) students who perform well in their Singapore-Cambridge GCE Normal Level examinations. Students can move from one course to another based on their performance and the assessment of the school principal and teachers.

Normal (Technical) course 
The Normal (Technical) course prepares students for a technical-vocational education at the Institute of Technical Education. Students will offer 5-7 subjects in the Singapore-Cambridge GCE Normal Level examinations. The curriculum is tailored towards strengthening students’ proficiency in English and Mathematics. Students take English Language, Mathematics, Basic Mother Tongue and Computer Applications as compulsory subjects.

Principals

References 

Secondary schools in Singapore
Choa Chu Kang
Educational institutions established in 1992
1992 establishments in Singapore